Svetlana Broz (born 7 July 1955) is a Bosnian author and physician who specializes in cardiology. She is the granddaughter of the Yugoslav leader Josip Broz Tito.

Early and personal life
Zlata Jelinek-Broz from Tuzla. As a teenager, Broz worked as a free-lance journalist from 1970 to 1975; many of her articles and interviews were published in newspapers and magazines.

She graduated from the Belgrade Medical School in 1980 and has served as a cardiologist at the Military Medical Academy from 1981 to 1999, and volunteered her services at the outbreak of the war in Bosnia and Herzegovina in 1992. Her new project is about inter-ethnic marriages entered into during the war. At the outbreak of the war in Bosnia and Herzegovina in 1992 she volunteered to work as a cardiologist in the atrocity zones. Over and over again her patients told her how their survival had been possible only thanks to individuals with the courage to stand up against the ethnic violence perpetrated by members of their own ethnic group, and in January 1993 she began interviewing for the book that describes these human experiences during the Bosnian War. The book was published in Bosnia and Herzegovina in 1999 with a title Dobri ljudi u vremenu zla and in 2003 in the United States under the title Good People in an Evil Time.

In 2000, she moved to Sarajevo, Bosnia and Herzegovina permanently. The reason for this was, as she stated in a 2005 interview for Bosnian daily newspaper Nezavisne novine: "After the NATO intervention, I moved to Sarajevo. Twenty years ago, Belgrade was a European metropolis, a city that I loved a lot. Unfortunately, in a way that city has lost its soul. Sarajevo, despite going through a four-year-long siege of hell, kept its soul intact. I love Bosnia-Herzegovina, I feel as this is my homeland. Last year I even became a citizen."

Career
Broz is currently heading the local branch of the Gardens of the Righteous Worldwide (GARIWO) non-governmental organization. She is the founder of "Education Towards Civil Courage", a series of seminars designed to teach adolescents from all over the Balkans how to stand up to corruption and social and political divisiveness. In 2007, the organization began research and preparation for the foundation of a Center for Civil Courage in Bosnia-Herzegovina.

Since 2001 Broz has headed the organization GARIWO (technically a subsidiary of the Italian non-profit body Gardens of the Righteous Worldwide) with its flagship program Education on Civil Courage.
 
When her colleague and Director of  Summer School of Civil Courage, Professor Dusko Kondor was assassinated on February 22. 2007, Broz launched, in Dusko's memory, the annual Dusko Kondor Civil Courage Awards. Over the course of the 6 years of its existence, this prestigious award was given to 30 laureates.

She has organized lectures and edited and published 14 books on civil courage translated from different languages. Broz is now working on screen plays and editing documentary films for a TV series called “The Best Among Us” as powerful lessons in ethics and civics for present and future generations in the West Balkans, Europe and beyond.

She has authored two books: Good People in an Evil Time – Portraits of Complicity and Resistance in the Bosnian War, translated by Ellen Elias-Bursać (2003) and
Having What it Takes – Essays on Civil Courage, edited by Tom Butler, (2006).

Her work is internationally recognized for its educational innovation and unique approach. She has lectured at over 100 universities in the US and Europe.

Awards and honors
Broz was honored in 2011 by French President Nicolas Sarkozy with the award of the Ordre National du Merite.

She is an honorary citizen of the city of Tuzla, Bosnia and Herzegovina, her mother's hometown. In 2007 Centro Educativo Italo Svizzero, in Rimini, Italy awarded her the La Bussola dell’ Educazione “Margherita Zoebeli”; in 2003 the City Government of Milan, Italy awarded her L'Ambrogino d'Oro and dedicated a tree and stone to her in the World Garden of the Righteous.

Writings
Good People in an Evil Time, 2002.
Having What It Takes: Essays on Civil Courage, 2006

References

External links

Biography
GARIWO Sarajevo
Svetlana Broz Homepage

1955 births
Living people
Writers from Belgrade
Writers from Sarajevo
Physicians from Belgrade
University of Belgrade Faculty of Medicine alumni
Yugoslav cardiologists
Bosnia and Herzegovina cardiologists
Bosnia and Herzegovina journalists
Bosnia and Herzegovina women journalists
Bosnia and Herzegovina people of Croatian descent
Bosnia and Herzegovina people of Slovenian descent
Bosnia and Herzegovina people of Russian descent